The MGH Institute of Health Professions (The MGH Institute) is a private university focused on the health sciences and located in Boston, Massachusetts. It was founded by Massachusetts General Hospital in 1977 and is accredited by the New England Commission of Higher Education.

History
From 1873 until 1981, Massachusetts General Hospital operated the Massachusetts General Hospital School of Nursing, granting diplomas in nursing only. In 1977, the State of Massachusetts authorized the hospital system to grant academic degrees, and that same year the Massachusetts General Hospital Academic Division was launched.

The program was renamed MGH Institute of Health Professions in 1980, admitting its first cohort of students. The first degrees granted was a Master of Science in Physical Therapy with the first class graduating in 1983. The school began admitting its first entry-level Master of Nursing Science students in 1982. In 1985, MGH Institute of Health Professions was re-constituted as a separate corporation from Massachusetts General Hospital, and in 2001 it moved into the Charlestown Navy Yard in Boston where it now has more than 125,000 square feet of space in seven buildings.

Today, the IHP offers the following degrees: Doctor of Occupational Therapy, Doctor of Physical Therapy, Master of Science in Communication Sciences and Disorders, Master of Science in Nursing, Master of Physician Assistant Studies, and an Accelerated Bachelor of Science in Nursing.  The IHP also offers several post-professional programs: PhD in Rehabilitation Sciences, Doctor of Speech Language Pathology, Doctor of Nursing Practice, and Master of Science in Health Professions Education, along with several certificates. The institute has an alumni base of over 7,200 worldwide.

Academics

The MGH Institute offers a single undergraduate degree, an accelerated Bachelor of Science in Nursing. The rest of its academic programs focus on graduate degrees. Established in 2013, the institute's entry-level Doctor of Occupational Therapy program was the first of its kind in New England. Other programs include graduate certificate offerings, several non-degree course options, and Certificates of Advanced Study in the health professions.

The institute and its programs are all accredited by their corresponding accreditation bodies, including the New England Association of Schools and Colleges, the Massachusetts Board of Registration in Nursing, the Commission on Collegiate Nursing Education, the Council on Academic Accreditation of the American Speech-Language-Hearing Association, the Commission on Accreditation in Physical Therapy Education, and the Massachusetts Department of Elementary and Secondary Education.

Student demographics

In 2011, the institute's student body was 85 percent female and 62 percent were enrolled as full-time students. The graduation rate for the school was high, with over 98 percent matriculating through to the end of their degree program. Non-degree seeking students, including those in continuing health professions education courses, accounted for roughly 18 percent of the total student enrollment.

Facilities

The institute has over 159,000 square feet of classroom and laboratory space at its campus, including space for pro-bono rehabilitation centers, simulation labs and general faculty and student research.

References

External links
 Official website

Private universities and colleges in Massachusetts
Nursing schools in Massachusetts
Educational institutions established in 1985
Massachusetts General Hospital
Universities and colleges in Boston
1985 establishments in Massachusetts